Alberto Belsué Arias (born 2 March 1968) is a Spanish retired professional footballer who played as a right-back.

He amassed La Liga totals of 319 matches and seven goals over 12 seasons, representing in the competition Zaragoza, Alavés and Numancia and winning two major titles with the first club.

Club career
Belsué was born in Zaragoza, Aragon. After beginning with lowly Endesa de Andorra, he joined La Liga club Real Zaragoza, where he would make over 300 competitive appearances, starting in the side's two major conquests in the decade: the 1994 Copa del Rey and the following year's UEFA Cup Winners' Cup.

Following stints with Deportivo Alavés and CD Numancia– in both cases barely avoiding top-flight relegation – Belsué retired after an abroad spell with Greece's Iraklis Thessaloniki FC, aged 33.

International career
A Spanish international for two years, Belsué made his debut on 16 November 1994 in a UEFA Euro 1996 qualifier 3–0 win against Denmark in Seville (90 minutes played). In the final stages in England he appeared in two of the nation's four matches, converting his attempt in the quarter-final penalty shootout loss to the hosts.

Honours
Zaragoza
Copa del Rey: 1993–94
UEFA Cup Winners' Cup: 1994–95

References

External links

1968 births
Living people
Spanish footballers
Footballers from Zaragoza
Association football defenders
La Liga players
Segunda División B players
Tercera División players
Real Zaragoza players
Deportivo Alavés players
CD Numancia players
Super League Greece players
Iraklis Thessaloniki F.C. players
Spain international footballers
UEFA Euro 1996 players
Spanish expatriate footballers
Expatriate footballers in Greece
Spanish expatriate sportspeople in Greece